James Wolcott Wadsworth (October 12, 1846 – December 24, 1926) was an American farmer, soldier and statesman.

Early life
Wadsworth was porn in Philadelphia to General James Samuel Wadsworth and Mary Craig (née Wharton) Wadsworth.  His brothers were Charles Frederick Wadsworth and Craig Wharton Wadsworth, the father of Craig Wharton Wadsworth, Jr. His elder sister, Cornelia Wadsworth Ritchie Adair became prominent as matriarch of Glenveagh Castle in County Donegal, Ireland, and the large JA Ranch in the Texas Panhandle. His younger sister, Elizabeth S. Wadsworth, married firstly Arthur Post in 1875, and secondly in 1889, as a widow, Arthur Smith-Barry, 1st Baron Barrymore, becoming Lady Barrymore.

His paternal grandfather, James Wadsworth, and his grandfather's brother, William Wadsworth, moved from Durham, Connecticut, and were the original settlers of Geneseo.

He was educated at the Hopkins School in New Haven, Connecticut, preparing to attend Yale, however, he did not attend, instead joining the Army in 1864.

Career
In 1864, Wadsworth joined the Union army and served during the Civil War.  On January 24, 1865, he was awarded a brevet major for "gallant and meritorious service at the Battle of Five Forks, Va."  He honorably mustered out June 25, 1865.

Political career
He was a member of the New York State Assembly (Livingston Co.) in 1878 and 1879.  He served as the New York State Comptroller from January 1, 1880, to December 31, 1881, elected at the New York state election, 1879.

He was elected to the 47th United States Congress to fill the vacancy caused by the resignation of Elbridge G. Lapham, and re-elected to the 48th United States Congresses, serving from December 5, 1881, to March 3, 1885.  In 1885, he ran again for State Comptroller but was defeated by Democrat Alfred C. Chapin.

He ran again in 1890 and was elected the 52nd, 53rd, 54th, 55th, 56th, 57th, 58th and 59th United States Congresses, serving from March 4, 1891, to March 3, 1907.  He was talked about as a candidate for Governor of New York, but did not run.  In 1906, he was defeated for re-election by Peter A. Porter.

He was a delegate to the 1884 and 1904 Republican National Conventions.  He was a delegate to the New York State Constitutional Convention of 1915.

Personal life
On September 14, 1876, he was married to Louise Travers (1848–1931), the daughter of wealthy New York lawyer, William R. Travers, and granddaughter of U.S. Senator and U.S. Minister to the United Kingdom Reverdy Johnson.  Together, they were the parents of:

 James Wolcott Wadsworth, Jr. (1877–1952), who became a U.S. Senator and married Alice Evelyn Hay, daughter of Secretary of State John Hay.
 Harriet Travers Wadsworth (1881–1975), who married Fletcher Harper, a polo player and fox hunter who was the grandson of Fletcher Harper, in 1913.

Wadsworth died on December 24, 1926, in Washington, D.C.  He was buried at the Temple Hill Cemetery in Geneseo, New York. His gravestone reads: "Soldier in the Civil War / Public Servant / Patron of Sport / Farmer all his Days". His widows died in 1931.

Descendants
His grandson, James Jeremiah Wadsworth (1905–1984), served as United States Ambassador to the United Nations.  His granddaughter, Evelyn Wadsworth (1903–1972), married William Stuart Symington, Jr. (1901–1988), the first Secretary of the Air Force and a Democratic U.S. Senator from Missouri, who unsuccessfully sought the Democratic presidential nomination in 1960.  His great-grandson, James Wadsworth Symington (b. 1927) served in the U.S. House of Representatives from Missouri as a Democrat and his great-great grandson, William Stuart Symington IV (b. 1952), is currently serving as the United States Ambassador to Nigeria and was the former U.S. Special Representative for the Central African Republic.

Legacy and honors
He received an honorary A.M. degree from Yale University in 1898.

The Wadsworth Hospital, Theatre and Chapel at the Sawtelle Veterans Home in Los Angeles, California, are named in his honor.

References

External links

 Mahood, Wayne. General Wadsworth: The Life and Times of Brevet Major General James S. Wadsworth. Cambridge, MA: Da Capo Press, 2003. .
The Political Graveyard: Index to Politicians: Wadham to Wagman at politicalgraveyard.com Political Graveyard
 History of US Congress (47th Congress)

1846 births
1926 deaths
Wadsworth family
New York State Comptrollers
Republican Party members of the New York State Assembly
Politicians from Philadelphia
Union Army officers
Republican Party members of the United States House of Representatives from New York (state)